Sonwar Bagh, sometimes referred to as Sonwar, is a residential area in Badami Bagh Cantonment on the outskirts of Srinagar city, in Srinagar district, Jammu and Kashmir, India. It is gradually becoming more commercial, as many schools, hotels and restaurants have been established there. 

It is home to many politicians like the ex-Chief Minister, Omar Abdullah 
who became the 11th, and youngest, Chief Minister of the Indian Administered state Jammu and Kashmir. 

Sonwar Bagh was one of the worst affected areas from the 2014 India–Pakistan floods in Jammu and Kashmir. It is surrounded by Takht-i-Sulaiman Hill on top of which is Shankaracharya Temple

Location
Sonwar Bagh lies parallel to the Jhelum river and National Highway road near Sonwar Bazaar (market).

Languages
The official language of this area is Urdu. English, Hindi and Kashmiri languages are also spoken.

Subdivisions
Due to its large area it is divided into the following subdivisions:

 Iqbal Colony
 Indira Nagar
 Hamza Colony
 Old Sonwar Mohalla
 Palpora
 Banumsora
 Gupkar Road

Schools

There are more than ten schools in Sonwar Bagh, including:
 Burn Hall School
 Woodlands House School
 Saint Paul's School
 Rosewood School
 Government Girls Higher Secondary

2014 Kashmir floods

Sonwar Bagh was one of many areas of Srinagar, including Shivpora, Jawahar Nagar, Rajbagh, Gogji Bagh, Pandrathan, and Batwara, that was worst hit by the 2014 Kashmir floods. Sonwar Bagh was completely submerged for 21 days. Many houses were destroyed and damaged, but only a few people were killed. The water started to enter Sonwar Bagh at about 4:00 am because of a breach in Jhelum River bund. In a few hours it reached a level of more than one and a half storeys.

Features

The main pincodes of this area include 190001 and 190004.

Hospitals
GP Panth Hospital, Kashmir's only children's hospital, is situated in Sonwar Bagh.

Hotels

There are many hotels in Sonwar Bagh. The most famous of them are:
 Hotel Four Point by Sheraton (5 stars) 
 Hotel Pearl 
 Sulatniya Guest House
 Hotel Resident
 Hotel International
 Hotel Ruthana
 Hotel Gulfam
 Hotel Shangrila
 Hotel Grand Sultan
 Hotel Grand Mushtaq
 Hotel Green Mountain
 Hotel Kardar
 Hotel The Grand Plaza
 Hotel Indra
 Hotel Hill View
 Hotel Mountain View
 Hotel Rash Residency
 Hotel Akbar Inn
 Hotel Silverine
 Hotel Ground Plaza
 Hotel Fortune Inn
 Heritage Studio Boutique guest House

Cinemas
 INOX multiplex at Shivpora in Sonwar near Badami Bagh Cantonment is situated. Earlier Broadway Cinema was situated at the same site.

Restaurants and cafes

 Cafe Coffee Day
 Seasons Restaurant
 Bites
 Go Chatzz

References

Neighbourhoods in Srinagar